September 8 - Eastern Orthodox liturgical calendar - September 10

All fixed commemorations below celebrated on September 22 by Orthodox Churches on the Old Calendar.

For September 9th, Orthodox Churches on the Old Calendar commemorate the Saints listed on August 27.

Feasts
 Afterfeast of the Nativity of the Theotokos.

Saints
 Holy and Righteous Ancestors of God Joachim and Anna (parents of the Theotokos).
 Venerable Theophanes, Confessor and Faster, of Mount Diabenos (299)
 Martyr Chariton, by the sword.
 Martyr Severian of Sebaste (320)
 Saint Rufus, Bishop of Thessaloniki from 407 (434)
 Saint Agathocles of Koroni, Bishop of Koroni and a father of the Third Ecumenical Council (5th century)

Pre-Schism Western saints
 Martyrs Hyacinth, Alexander and Tiburtius, martyrs in the Sabine country in Italy, about thirty miles from Rome.
 Saint Kieran of Clonmacnoise (Ciaran, Kyran), one of the Twelve Apostles of Ireland and first Abbot of Clonmacnoise (c. 545)
 Saint Osmanna (Argariarga), a holy virgin who left Ireland for Brittany and became an anchoress in a hermitage near Saint-Brieuc (c. 650)
 Saint Omer (Audomarus), Bishop of Therouanne (670)
 Saint Bettelin (Bertram), Hermit of Crowland (8th century)
 Saint Wulfhilda of Barking, Abbess of Barking, Abbess of Horton, both in England (c. 1000)

Post-Schism Orthodox saints
 Blessed Nicetas the Hidden, of Constantinople (12th century)
 Venerable Joseph, founder of Volokolamsk (Volotsk) Monastery, Wonderworker (1515)
 Venerable Joachim, founder of Opochka Monastery, Pskov (c. 1550)
 Saint Joachim, monk of the St. Nicholas-Shartomsk Monastery in Suzdal (1625)
 Saint Cyriacus of Tazlau Monastery, Moldavia (1660)
 Venerable Onuphrius of Vorona, Moldavia (1789)

New martyrs and confessors
 New Hieromartyrs Gregory Garyev, Priest and Alexander Ipatov, Deacon (1918)
 New Hieromartyr Zachariah (Lobov), Archbishop of Voronezh (1937)
 New Hieromartyrs Sergius Uklonsky, Joseph Arkharov, Alexis Uspensky, Priests (1937)
 New Hieromartyr Dmitry Troitsky, Deacon (1937) 
 New Martyr Basil Shikalov (1937)
 New Hieromartyr Andronicus (Surikov), Hieromonk, of Moscow (1938)
 New Hieromartyr Alexander Vinogradov, Priest (1942)

Other commemorations
 Commemoration of the Third Ecumenical Council (431)
 Uncovering and Translation of the Relics (1896) of St. Theodosius, Archbishop of Chernigov (1696)
 Synaxis of the Elders of the Glinsk Monastery:
 Venerable Vasily (Kishkin)
 Venerable Philaret (Danilovsky)
 Venerable Theodoty (Levchenko)
 Venerable Makary (Sharov)
 Venerable Martiry (Kirichenko)
 Venerable Evfimy (Lyubimchenko)
 Venerable Dosithy (Kolchenkov)
 Venerable Iliadore (Golovantsky)
 Venerable Innokenty (Stepanov)
 Venerable Luke (Shvets)
 Venerable Archipy (Shestakov)
 Venerable Ioanniky (Gomolko)
 Venerable Seraphim (Amelin)
 Venerable Adronik (Lukash)
 Venerable Sraphim (Romantsov)
 Venerable Zinovy (Mazhugi), Metropolitan of Tetritsqaro (Seraphim in the schema).
 Repose of Elder Joachim of St. Anne’s Skete, Mount Athos (1950)
 Translation of the Relics (1992) of St. Gabriel of Białystok<ref> ŻYCIE ŚWIĘTEGO MĘCZENNIKA MŁODZIEŃCA GABRIELA Prawosławna Diecezja Białostocko-Gdańska (Orthodox Diocese of Bialystok and Gdansk). Retrieved February 4, 2018.</ref>

Icon gallery

Notes

References

Sources
 September 9/September 22. Orthodox Calendar (PRAVOSLAVIE.RU).
 September 22 / September 9. HOLY TRINITY RUSSIAN ORTHODOX CHURCH (A parish of the Patriarchate of Moscow).
 September 9. OCA - The Lives of the Saints.
 The Autonomous Orthodox Metropolia of Western Europe and the Americas (ROCOR). St. Hilarion Calendar of Saints for the year of our Lord 2004. St. Hilarion Press (Austin, TX). p. 67.
 The Ninth Day of the Month of September. Orthodoxy in China.
 September 9. Latin Saints of the Orthodox Patriarchate of Rome.
 The Roman Martyrology. Transl. by the Archbishop of Baltimore. Last Edition, According to the Copy Printed at Rome in 1914. Revised Edition, with the Imprimatur of His Eminence Cardinal Gibbons. Baltimore: John Murphy Company, 1916. pp. 277–278.
 Rev. Richard Stanton. A Menology of England and Wales, or, Brief Memorials of the Ancient British and English Saints Arranged According to the Calendar, Together with the Martyrs of the 16th and 17th Centuries. London: Burns & Oates, 1892. pp. 441–443.

 Greek Sources
 Great Synaxaristes:  9 ΣΕΠΤΕΜΒΡΙΟΥ. ΜΕΓΑΣ ΣΥΝΑΞΑΡΙΣΤΗΣ.
  Συναξαριστής. 9 Σεπτεμβρίου. ECCLESIA.GR. (H ΕΚΚΛΗΣΙΑ ΤΗΣ ΕΛΛΑΔΟΣ).
  09/09/.'' Ορθόδοξος Συναξαριστής.

 Russian Sources
  22 сентября (9 сентября). Православная Энциклопедия под редакцией Патриарха Московского и всея Руси Кирилла (электронная версия). (Orthodox Encyclopedia - Pravenc.ru).
  9 сентября по старому стилю  /  22 сентября по новому стилю. Русская Православная Церковь - Православный церковный календарь на  год.

September in the Eastern Orthodox calendar